Yumbe District is a district in Northern Region, Uganda. Like most other Ugandan districts, it is named after its 'chief town', Yumbe, where the district headquarters are located.

Location
Yumbe District is one of Uganda's most northern districts. The district is bordered by South Sudan to the north, Moyo District to the east, Adjumani District to the southeast, Arua District to the south, Maracha District to the southwest and Koboko District to the west. The coordinates of the district are:03 28N, 31 15E.

Overview
Yumbe District was established in 2006 when Aringa County was split off Arua District and renamed Yumbe District.The people in the district are still suffering from the effects of the civil war, which lasted about twenty years (1980–2000). The peace agreement between UNRF2 and the Government of Uganda was signed in the year 2000 in Yumbe.

The majority (89%) ethnicity in the district are the Aringa people. Other ethnicities include the Kakwa, Madi and the Alur. The Acholi are scattered along River Nile and mainly engage in fishing and hunting, along the river. They account for about 2% of the district's population.

The languages spoken in the district include: the Aringa language (majority), Kakwa language, Madi language and the Alur language. The second most-spoken language however is Kiswahili. In the urban areas, one might encounter individuals who can understand Arabic or English.

Population
Yumbe is the only district in the country with a mainly Muslim population (76%), which is a big exception for Uganda (85% of Ugandans are Christians). The fertility rate in the district is high (7.5).

In 1991, the national population census estimated the district population at about 99,800. The 2002 national census estimated the population of the district at about 251,800 inhabitants. The annual population growth rate in Yumbe District was calculated at 8.2%. It was estimated that the population of Yumbe District in 2012 was approximately 545,500.

Economic activities
Subsistence agriculture is the main economic activity in the district, as is the case with most Ugandan districts. Crops grown include the following:

See also

References

External links
Yumbe Fruit Farmers Get Mobile Processor

 
Districts of Uganda
West Nile sub-region
Northern Region, Uganda